The United States Air Force's 203d RED HORSE squadron is an Air National Guard unit located at Camp Pendleton, Virginia.  RED HORSE is an acronym formed from "Rapid Engineer Deployable Heavy Operational Repair Squadron Engineers"
 1985, the Air National Guard activated 203d RED HORSE Squadron at Camp Pendleton, Virginia.
 2001, March 3rd, a C-23 Sherpa carrying 18 Red Horse members and 3 Florida National Guardsmen crashed in Georgia, killing all onboard.

Mission
 To provide highly mobile, rapidly deployable civil engineering response force self-sufficient for worldwide deployment.

History

Major Command/Gaining Command

Major Command (MAJCOM), Air Combat Command (ACC), headquartered in Langly Air Force base, Virginia.

Previous designations

Bases stationed
 Camp Pendleton, Virginia (1985 – present)

Weapons Systems Operated
 (No weapons systems operated other than typical personal weapons, M16 rifle, M60 machine gun, M9 pistol, M203 grenade launcher.
This is because this unit is an engineering construction unit, like a civilian construction company, with all of the trades in the unit. Building all types of horizontal and vertical construction, including underground utilities. )

References

External links
 
  
 
  

RED HORSE 0202
Squadrons of the United States Air National Guard